John Browne was an English merchant, the first holder of the post of King's Gunfounder, which was created in 1615. He was heavily involved in the Wealden iron industry, having control of six furnaces in Surrey and Sussex, two in the Forest of Dean as well as his own furnace between Brenchley and Horsmonden.

Biography
During the reign of Charles I, he sold a great number of guns to the former United Provinces, the King being a partner in this traffic.

Browne also held a patent which gave him a monopoly on the casting of pots, pans and firebacks.

John Browne developed a type of cannon known as "The Drake" in the 1620s. This cannon was much lighter than previous cannons firing a similar weight of shot, thus enabling ships to be more heavily armed. This cannon weighed 3cwt, 2qtrs, 23 lbs and had a 3½" (89mm) muzzle. It fired shot weighing . HMS Swan was the last ship built for Charles I; its guns were all cast in iron. A larger ship,  had 92 Drakes, cast in bronze, as well as 10 non-Drakes, also cast in bronze.

In 1642, John Browne was ordered by Parliament to deliver a list of "grenadoes" being held at the Stillyard, and he was not to deliver them except with the Order of the House.  In 1645, John Browne and his son were ordered by Parliament to be taken into safe custody, and no visitor was allowed to be alone with either of them, because he was suspected of supporting the Royalist cause. Browne appears to have been released in December 1645. John Browne died in 1651. In 1677, another John Browne built a boring mill at Birchden Forge, Rotherfield.

Browne's wife Martha is commemorated by a cast iron graveslab in St Margaret's Church, Horsmonden.

References

Sources

External links
Photo of the retrieved cannon

English businesspeople
Year of birth missing
1651 deaths